Chloroclystis primivernalis is a moth in the family Geometridae first described by William Warren in 1907. It is endemic to Indonesia.

References

External links

Moths described in 1907
primivernalis
Endemic fauna of Indonesia